National Road 67 (abbreviated as EO67) is a limited access road in northern Greece. It connects the Motorway 25 (Thessaloniki - Nea Moudania) with the Thessaloniki International Airport.

Thessaloniki (regional unit)
67
Roads in Central Macedonia